Tuco, Tuku, Tucu (possibly from Quechua tuku, owl) or Huanaco Punta (possibly from Quechua wanaku guanaco and Spanish punta peak, ridge; first, before, in front of) is a mountain in the Andes in South America. Its summit is ) high and it is one of the southernmost peaks in the snow-capped Cordillera Blanca in northwestern central Peru. Tuco is located in the Ancash Region, Bolognesi Province, Aquia District and in the Recuay Province, Catac District. It is situated northeast of Caullaraju, between Challhua in the west and Pastoruri in the east.

Other neighboring peaks are Juchuraju or Condorjitanca and Santón. Raju Cutac is the only peak further south in the Cordillera Blanca.

A stream also named Tuco originates near the mountain and flows out to lakes Aguashcocha and Conococha, at the headwaters of Santa River.

Sources 

Mountains of Peru
Mountains of Ancash Region
Five-thousanders of the Andes